Hedong is a town of Nanbu County in northeastern Sichuan province, China, located on the northeastern (left) bank of the Jialing River, across from the county seat. , it has two residential communities and nine villages under its administration.

References

Township-level divisions of Sichuan
Nanbu County